Wax plant may refer to:
 Hoya, a tropical climbing plants genus in the family Apocynaceae native to southern Asia, Australia and Polynesia
 Cynanchum elegans (white-flowered wax plant), a plant species found in New South Wales in Australia
 Euphorbia antisyphilitica (also called candelilla), a spurge species native to the  Southern United States and Mexico

See also
 Wax flower